Alex Labbé (born April 29, 1993) is a Canadian professional stock car racing driver. He competes part-time in the NASCAR Xfinity Series, driving the No. 36 Chevrolet Camaro for DGM Racing and the No. 28 Ford Mustang for RSS Racing. The 2017 NASCAR Pinty's Series champion, he has also competed in the Quebec's ACT Series and in the PASS North Series.

Racing career

Early years
He was the rookie of the year and champion of the Quebec's Super Truck Series in 2009, rookie of the year in the Quebec's ACT Series in 2010 and vice-champion in 2013. He won three races in the Quebec's ACT Series and two in the US-based ACT Tour.

In 2014, he became the youngest champion of the Quebec's ACT Series at 21. He also picked his first two wins in PASS North Series.

Pinty's Series
Labbé finished sixth in his first start in the NASCAR Canadian Tire Series at Circuit ICAR in 2012. He continued to run sporadically with his family team, but then scored a pole in his first start with Dave Jacombs at Autodrome Saint-Eustache in 2014. However, Labbe fell out of the race with suspension problems. Running part-time with Jacombs again in 2015, Labbe scored another pole, this one at Autodrome Chaudière, and finished a career-high second. Labbe drove for Go Fas Racing in 2016, running the full schedule for the first time in the No. 32 Can-Am Ford, grabbing four poles and winning what some say was the best race ever in the Pinty's Series, at Autodrome Chaudiere over Cayden Lapcevich by just over .3 seconds. After finishing seventh in championship points in 2016, Labbe will return to the No. 32 in 2017. In 2018, he only drove for one race with Jacombs Racing at Circuit Trois-Rivières, where he finished 3rd. In 2019, he drove for Jacombs Racing for a full-time season, excluding the final race which was run by Sam Charland. He finished 8th in the standings.

Xfinity Series
Labbé made his Xfinity Series debut at Phoenix International Raceway in November 2016, driving the No. 90 Chevrolet Camaro for King Autosport. He finished 23rd. It was announced in April 2017 that he would make his second start at Texas Motor Speedway, with the same team he drove in 2016.

In 2018, Labbé partnered with DGM Racing to drive the No. 36 Camaro full-time in the Xfinity Series.

He returned for a limited schedule in the No. 90 car the following year for DGM, and finished sixth at the Charlotte Motor Speedway Roval in September.

In 2020, he returned to the No. 36 for a majority of races, while he did the No. 90 for the events the No. 36 was not entered in or had other drivers in. In August, Labbé received a penalty for driving an Xfinity car in a Sports Car Club of America practice session at the Daytona Road Course ahead of the Xfinity Series race there, a violation of NASCAR's testing policy; the penalty resulted in him and his No. 36 team losing 75 points each and the latter being fined $50,000. The team appealed the ruling to the National Motorsports Appeals Panel, who rescinded the punishment.

A full season in the No. 36 came in 2021. He finished 19th in points with three top tens.

In 2022, Labbé returned to the No. 90 at Daytona, which was his first ever DNQ, before moving on to his old No. 36, which was driven by Spire Motorsports star Josh Bilicki at Daytona. Despite the lack of sponsorship, he ran every race after Daytona until Charlotte. Garrett Smithley would replace Labbe at Charlotte, since Smithley had sufficient sponsorship.

In 2023, Labbé would once again fail to qualify for the season opener, and would run for RSS Racing in the No. 28 Ford for the next two races, which would be the first time he drove for another team rather than DGM in the Xfinity Series.

Motorsports career results

NASCAR
(key) (Bold – Pole position awarded by qualifying time. Italics – Pole position earned by points standings or practice time. * – Most laps led.)

Xfinity Series

 Season still in progress
 Ineligible for series points

Pinty's Series

References

External links

 
 

Living people
1993 births
People from Centre-du-Québec
Racing drivers from Quebec
NASCAR drivers